Madison Dam is a hydroelectric dam on the Madison River in Madison County, Montana, in the southwestern part of the state.

The timber-crib dam was constructed in 1906 as a replacement for a similar 1901 dam and powerhouse on the same site. Montana Power Company acquired the dam in 1912 as part of a merger, PPL Corporation purchased it in 1997 and sold it to NorthWestern Corporation in 2014.

The lake is relatively shallow and warms significantly during the summer, which tends to decrease fish populations. The lake supports recreational fishing for brown trout and rainbow trout, camping, boating, and white-water rafting in Bear Trap Canyon downstream (north) of the dam.

References

External links

Dams in Montana
Reservoirs in Montana
NorthWestern Corporation dams
Buildings and structures in Madison County, Montana
Dams completed in 1906
Historic American Engineering Record in Montana
Landforms of Madison County, Montana
1906 establishments in Montana